Benzylamine is an organic chemical compound with the condensed structural formula C6H5CH2NH2 (sometimes abbreviated as PhCH2NH2 or BnNH2).  It consists of a benzyl group, C6H5CH2, attached to an amine functional group, NH2. This colorless water-soluble liquid is a common precursor in organic chemistry and used in the industrial production of many pharmaceuticals.  The hydrochloride salt was used to treat motion sickness on the Mercury-Atlas 6 mission in which NASA astronaut John Glenn became the first American to orbit the Earth.

Manufacturing
Benzylamine can be produced by several methods, the main industrial route being the reaction of benzyl chloride and ammonia.  It is also produced by the reduction of benzonitrile and reductive amination of benzaldehyde, both done over Raney nickel.

It was first produced accidentally by Rudolf Leuckart in the reaction of benzaldehyde with formamide in a process now known as the Leuckart reaction, a general process in which reductive amination of aldehydes or ketones yields the corresponding amine.

Biochemistry
Benzylamine occurs biologically from the action of the N-substituted formamide deformylase enzyme, which is produced by Arthrobacter pascens bacteria.  This hydrolase catalyses the conversion of N-benzylformamide into benzylamine with formate as a by-product.   Benzylamine is degraded biologically by the action of the monoamine oxidase B enzyme, resulting in benzaldehyde.

Uses
Benzylamine is used as a masked source of ammonia, since after N-alkylation, the benzyl group can be removed by hydrogenolysis:
C6H5CH2NH2  +  2 RBr  →   C6H5CH2NR2  +  2 HBr
C6H5CH2NR2  +  H2  →   C6H5CH3  +  R2NH
Typically a base is employed in the first step to absorb the HBr (or related acid for other kinds of alkylating agents).

Benzylamine reacts with acetyl chloride to form N-benzylacetamide, an exemplar of the Schotten–Baumann reaction first described in the 1880s.  The reaction takes place in a two-phase solvent system (here water and diethyl ether) so that the hydrogen chloride by-product is sequestered in the aqueous phase (and sometimes neutralised with a dissolved base) and thus prevented from protonating the amine and impeding the progress of the reaction.  These conditions are often called Schotten-Baumann reaction conditions and are applicable more generally.  This particular example is useful as a model for the mechanism of interfacial polymerisation of a diamine with a diacid chloride.

Isoquinolines are a class of compounds (benzopyridines) which are used in medical contexts (such as the anesthetic dimethisoquin, the antihypertensive debrisoquine, and the vasodilator papaverine) and in other areas (such as disinfectant N-laurylisoquinolinium bromide).  Isoquinoline itself is efficiently prepared using the Pomeranz–Fritsch reaction, but can also be prepared from benzylamine and glyoxal acetal by an analogous approach known as the Schlittler-Müller modification to the Pomeranz–Fritsch reaction.  This modification can also be used for preparing substituted isoquinolines.

The aza-Diels–Alder reaction converts imines and dienes to tetrahydropyridines in which the nitrogen atom can be part of the diene or the dienophile. The imine is often generated in situ from an amine and formaldehyde. An example is the reaction of cyclopentadiene with benzylamine to form an aza-norbornene.

Benzylamine is used in the industrial manufacturer of numerous pharmaceuticals, including alniditan, lacosamide, moxifloxacin, and nebivolol.  It is also used to manufacture the military explosive hexanitrohexaazaisowurtzitane (HNIW) which is superior to older nitroamine high explosives like HMX and RDX, though it is less stable.  The US Navy is testing HNIW for use in rocket propellants, such as for missiles, as it has lower observability characteristics such as less visible smoke.  HNIW is prepared by first condensing benzylamine with glyoxal in acetonitrile under acidic and dehydrating conditions.  Four of the benzyl groups are removed from hexabenzylhexaazaisowurtzitane by hydrogenolysis catalysed by  palladium on carbon and the resulting secondary amine groups are acetylated in acetic anhydride.  The resulting dibenzyl-substituted intermediate is then reacted with nitronium tetrafluoroborate and nitrosonium tetrafluoroborate in sulfolane to produce HNIW.

Salts
The hydrochloride salt of benzylamine, C6H5CH2NH3Cl or C6H5CH2NH2·HCl, is prepared by reacting benzylamine with hydrochloric acid, and can be used in treating motion sickness.  NASA astronaut John Glenn was issued with benzylamine hydrochloride for this purpose for the Mercury-Atlas 6 mission. The cation in this salt is called benzylammonium and is a moiety found in pharmaceuticals such as the anthelmintic agent bephenium hydroxynaphthoate, used in treating ascariasis.

Other derivatives of benzylamine and its salts have been shown to have anti-emetic properties, including those with the N-(3,4,5-trimethoxybenzoyl)benzylamine moiety.  Commercially available motion-sickness agents including cinnarizine and meclizine are derivatives of benzylamine.

Other benzylamines
1-Phenylethylamine is a methylated benzylamine derivative which is chiral; enantiopure forms are obtained by resolving racemates.  Its racemic form is sometimes known as (±)-α-methylbenzylamine.  Both benzylamine and 1-phenylethylamine form stable ammonium salts and imines due to their relatively high basicity.

Safety and environment
Benzylamine exhibits modest oral toxicity in rats with LD50 of 1130 mg/kg.  It is readily biodegraded.

References

Amines
Benzyl compounds